Mark Jefferson Golding (born 19 July 1965) is a Jamaican attorney, investment banker, and politician who has been Opposition Leader of Jamaica and President of the People's National Party since November 2020, following the 2020 Presidential Election. He was a member of the Senate of Jamaica from 2007 to 2017 and served as Minister of Justice from 2012 to 2016. He was elected as Member of Parliament for South St Andrew in 2017 and is a member of the People's National Party (PNP).

On 7 November 2020, Mark Golding was elected as the 6th president of the PNP after polling 1740 delegate votes to defeat Lisa Hanna who polled 1440 in an election that saw 96% voter turnout amongst delegates in the 2020 People's National Party leadership election.

Career

Business 
Golding was admitted to the bar in 1990 and joined the Hart Muirhead Fatta Law firm. In 1993, He co-founded Dehring Bunting & Golding Limited, Jamaica's first private sector investment bank which became one of the leading financial institutions in the Caribbean. Over the course of his career, Golding has served as a director at GraceKennedy Limited Caribbean Information, Credit Rating Services Limited, and the Bank of Nova Scotia under Scotia Limited. Golding is also the chairman of the Mona Rehabilitation Foundation and of Arnett Gardens F.C. In 2010, Golding co-founded Proven Investment Limited, a publicly listed investment company.

Political 
Golding was appointed to the Senate of Jamaica in 2007 by then-prime minister Portia Simpson-Miller, who named him as the Minister of Justice after the PNP electoral victory in the 2011 Jamaican general election. He was also named Chairman of the Legislation Committee of Cabinet. During this 4-year term, 121 Acts of Parliament were passed. Golding was behind the island-wide decriminalization of marijuana. In 2017, Golding was elected to Parliament as the representative for South St. Andrew.

After the PNP's loss in the 2020 election, Golding announced his intention to run for leadership of the party. Golding won the Presidency of the PNP on November 7, 2020, defeating Lisa Hanna. He received praise for the upstanding nature of his campaign.

Personal life 
Mark was born in Kingston and is the only son of John and Patricia Golding. His father served as a doctor for British forces in World War II and moved to Jamaica the following decade. His mother grew up in Westmoreland. Mark has an older sister who resides in Trinidad and Tobago. He was educated at Mona Prep, Campion College, Jamaica, Marlborough College, University of Oxford and University College London.

Mark married his wife, Sandra, in 1990. They have three children. He was a musician throughout his time at Oxford University and was the co-owner of a music label in the late 1990s.

Notes

External links 
 

1967 births
Members of the Senate of Jamaica
Alumni of University College London
Living people
Justice ministers of Jamaica
20th-century Jamaican lawyers
Jamaican bankers
Investment bankers
21st-century Jamaican politicians
21st-century Jamaican lawyers
Members of the 13th Parliament of Jamaica
Members of the 14th Parliament of Jamaica